Eunoe nodulosa is a scale worm described from Saldanha Bay on the Western Cape, South Africa from intertidal depths.

Description
Number of segments 45; elytra 15 pairs. No distinct pigmentation pattern. prostomium anterior margin comprising two rounded lobes. Lateral antennae inserted ventrally (beneath prostomium and median antenna). elytra marginal fringe of papillae present. Notochaetae about as thick as neurochaetae. Bidentate neurochaetae absent.

References

Phyllodocida